Poeta (Spanish: poet) may refer to:

Biology
Poeta (moth)

Music
El poeta, a 1980 opera by Federico Moreno Torroba
Poeta, a 1997 album by Vicente Amigo
"El Poeta" (song), a 2011 song by Chino & Nacho

People
Giuseppe Poeta (born 1985), Italian basketball player
Patrícia Poeta (born 1976), Brazilian newscaster and journalist
Tony Poeta (1933–2004), Canadian ice hockey player